Mchinga is an administrative ward and capital of Kibaha District in Pwani Region of Tanzania. 
According to the 2012 census, the ward has a total population of 17,318.

References

Populated places in Pwani Region